South Northumberland (formally the "Southern Division of Northumberland") was a county constituency of the House of Commons of the Parliament of the United Kingdom. It was represented by two Members of Parliament (MPs), elected by the bloc vote system.

The area was created by the Great Reform Act of 1832 by the splitting of Northumberland constituency into Northern and Southern divisions.

It was abolished by the Redistribution of Seats Act 1885, when Northumberland was divided into four single member divisions: Berwick-upon-Tweed, Hexham, Tyneside and Wansbeck.

Boundaries 
1832–1885: The Wards of Tynedale and Castle, and the Town and County of the Town of Newcastle upon Tyne.

Members of Parliament 

Constituency created (1832)

Elections

Elections in the 1830s

Elections in the 1840s

Elections in the 1850s

Elections in the 1860s

Elections in the 1870s

 

Liddell was elevated to the peerage, becoming Earl of Ravensworth.

 

 The original count for this by-election had both candidates receiving 2,912 votes.

Elections in the 1880s

See also 

 History of parliamentary constituencies and boundaries in Northumberland

References 

Parliamentary constituencies in Northumberland (historic)
Constituencies of the Parliament of the United Kingdom established in 1832
Constituencies of the Parliament of the United Kingdom disestablished in 1885